David Bankole Adeleye (born 16 November 1996) is a British professional boxer. As an amateur, he competed at the 2013 English National Junior Championships in the heavyweight event.

Early life
David Bankole Adeleye was born on 16 November 1996 in London, England, the son of Nigerian parents who hailed from Ikole in Ekiti State, Nigeria. Adeleye's parents never wished for him to go into professional boxing until he had at least finished higher-education. When Adeleye was growing up, he admired Lennox Lewis, Muhammad Ali and Roy Jones Jr.

Amateur career
Adeleye began boxing at the Dale Youth Club, at the age of fourteen, under the tutelage of Gary McGuiness. He became Junior ABA champion in 2013, and winning the Senior ABA Novices in 2017 before winning the Senior ABA title in 2018. He later represented England in an international against Denmark in 2018 and secured gold at the British Universities and Colleges Sport Boxing Championships.

Professional career
On 12 July 2019, it was confirmed that Adeleye had turned professional under Frank Warren's Queensberry Promotions banner. Adeleye made his professional debut on 21 December 2019, on the undercard of Daniel Dubois against Kyotaro Fujimoto for the vacant WBC Silver heavyweight title at the Copper Box Arena in London. The referee, Mark Bates, called a halt to proceedings as Adeleye defeated Lithunaian fighter Dmitrij Kalinovskij via technical knockout (TKO) in the first round. On 10 July 2020, Adeleye returned with a second-round knockout over Matt Gordon at the BT Sport Studio in London. Adeleye's third fight was a return to the BT Sport Studio on 29 August against Phil Williams, whom Adeleye stopped in the third round, achieving his third knockout victory in a row.

Personal life
Adeleye, who had combined amateur boxing with his studies, graduated in 2018 from the University of Wolverhampton with a degree in Business Management, in which his dissertation was on the business aspect of boxing.

Professional boxing record

References

External links 

1996 births
Living people
Heavyweight boxers
Super-heavyweight boxers
English male boxers
Boxers from Greater London
English people of Nigerian descent
Black British sportsmen
Alumni of the University of Wolverhampton